In computational complexity theory, a  nonelementary problem is a problem that is not a member of the class ELEMENTARY. As a class it is sometimes denoted as NONELEMENTARY.

Examples of nonelementary problems that are nevertheless decidable include:
 the problem of regular expression equivalence with complementation
 the decision problem for monadic second-order logic over trees (see  S2S)
 the decision problem for term algebras
 satisfiability of W. V. O. Quine's fluted fragment of first-order logic
 deciding β-convertibility of two closed terms in typed lambda calculus
 reachability in vector addition systems; it is  Ackermann-complete.

References

Complexity classes